Gergely Gyertyános is a Hungarian sprint canoer who has competed since the mid-2000s. He won a complete set of medals at the ICF Canoe Sprint World Championships with a gold in 2005 (K-4 200 m), a silver in 2006 (K-4 200 m), and a bronze in 2007 (K-1 200 m).

In recent years, he has been working as the coach of the national kayak team of Burma.

References

Hungarian male canoeists
Living people
Year of birth missing (living people)
ICF Canoe Sprint World Championships medalists in kayak
21st-century Hungarian people